Catalina Murillo Valverde (born 6 June 1970) is a Costa Rican author and screenwriter, winner of the  in 2018 for her novel Maybe Managua.

Biography
Catalina Murillo Valverde was born in a taxi in San José on 6 June 1970.

She attended college at the Liceo Franco Costarricense. She studied collective communication sciences at the University of Costa Rica and screenwriting at the Escuela Internacional de Cine y Televisión (EICTV) in San Antonio de los Baños, Cuba.

At age 28 she emigrated to Madrid, Spain. She lived there for a decade, working as a film and television screenwriter, and as an analyst and screenwriting tutor. She has been a juror and script reader for contests and festivals such as Oaxaca Sundance, Ibermedia, the Costa Rica International Book Fair, and the Guadalajara International Book Fair. She was a juror at the 2018 San José shnit international shortfilmfestival.

She has published Largo Domingo Cubano (1995), Marzo todopoderoso (2003), Corredoiras y Largo Domingo Cubano (2017), and Tiembla, Memoria (2017).

She is currently a script consultant and teacher at Fuentetaja Workshops, as well as a thesis tutor at the International University of La Rioja (UNIR).

References

External links
 Catalina Murillo at Fuentetaja Workshops
 

1970 births
21st-century Costa Rican women writers
21st-century Costa Rican writers
Costa Rican novelists
Living people
University of Costa Rica alumni
Women television writers
Writers from San José, Costa Rica
21st-century screenwriters